Peter Burroughs (born 27 January 1947) is a British television and film actor and the director of Willow Management. He is the father-in-law of actor and TV presenter Warwick Davis.

Early career 
Burroughs initially ran a shop in his village at Yaxley, Cambridgeshire.

His first dramatic role was that of the character "Branic" in the 1979 television series The Legend of King Arthur. He also acted in the television shows Dick Turpin, The Goodies, Doctor Who in the serial The King's Demons and One Foot in the Grave.

Film career 
Burroughs played roles in Hollywood movies such as Flash Gordon, George Lucas' Star Wars: Episode VI – Return of the Jedi (a swinging ewok), Willow, The Dark Crystal, Labyrinth and The Hitchhiker's Guide to the Galaxy. In 1995, Burroughs set up Willow Management, an agency for short actors, along with co-actor Warwick Davis. He portrayed a bank goblin in the Harry Potter series (Harry Potter and the Philosopher's Stone and Harry Potter and the Deathly Hallows – Part 2).

Personal life 
His daughter Samantha (born 1971), is married to Star Wars: Episode VI – Return of the Jedi and Willow film star Warwick Davis. He has another daughter, Hayley Burroughs, who is also an actress. His granddaughter is Annabelle Davis.

Filmography

References

External links 

British male film actors
1947 births
Living people
Actors with dwarfism
Place of birth missing (living people)
British male television actors
People from Yaxley, Cambridgeshire